Miles Anthony Reid FRS (born 30 January 1948) is a mathematician who works in algebraic geometry.

Education
Reid studied the Cambridge Mathematical Tripos at Trinity College, Cambridge and obtained his Ph.D. in 1973 under the supervision of Peter Swinnerton-Dyer and Pierre Deligne.

Career
Reid was a research fellow of Christ's College, Cambridge from 1973 to 1978.  He became a lecturer at the University of Warwick in 1978 and was appointed professor there in 1992.  He has written two well known books:  Undergraduate Algebraic Geometry and Undergraduate Commutative Algebra.

Awards and honours
Reid was elected a Fellow of the Royal Society in 2002. In the same year, he participated as an Invited Speaker in the 
International Congress of Mathematicians in Beijing. Reid was awarded the Senior Berwick Prize in 2006 for his paper with Alessio Corti and Aleksandr Pukhlikov, "Fano 3-fold hypersurfaces", which made a big advance in the study of 3-dimensional algebraic varieties.

Personal life
Reid speaks Japanese and Russian and has given lectures in Japanese.

Bibliography
His most famous book is
Undergraduate Algebraic Geometry, Cambridge University Press 1988 
Other books
Undergraduate commutative algebra, Cambridge University Press 1995, 
with Balazs Szendroi: Geometry and topology, Cambridge University Press 2007
His most famous translation is the two volume work by Shafarevich
Basic Algebraic Geometry 1
Basic Algebraic Geometry 2

References

1948 births
Living people
People from Hoddesdon
20th-century English mathematicians
21st-century English mathematicians
Algebraic geometers
Fellows of Christ's College, Cambridge
Fellows of the Royal Society
Academics of the University of Warwick
Alumni of Trinity College, Cambridge